Movement of Leftwing Radicals is a political party in Senegal. The general secretary of the party is Mamadou Bana Wagne. The party was registered on March 16, 2004.

Political parties established in 2004
Socialist parties in Senegal